George Warner may refer to:
 George Warner (rugby union), English rugby union player
 Sir George Frederic Warner, English archivist
 George Townsend Warner, English clergyman, schoolmaster and cricketer